Senator Maxwell may refer to:

Augustus Maxwell (1820–1903), Confederate States Senator from Florida
Chip Maxwell (born 1962), Nebraska State Senate
Edwin Maxwell (attorney general) (1825–1903), West Virginia State Senate
Joe Maxwell (born 1957), Missouri State Senate
Sylvester Maxwell (1775–1858), Massachusetts State Senate
W. Henry Maxwell (1935–2010), Virginia State Senate
Walter Maxwell (1836–1896), Wisconsin State Senate